Khoshk-e Bijar, ( Romanized as Khushk-e Bejār)  is a city and capital of Khoshk-e Bijar District, in Rasht County, Gilan Province, Iran.  
it had a population of 7,245 as of the 2016 census.

Historically Khoshkebijar
Khoshkebijar history dates back to about 800 years ago. At the time of the Mongol invasion in 706 AD, the city was sacked by the Mongol Sultan Srbazam this section (Salouk), which is a brave man and forced to surrender. During the Safaviye Shah Tahmasb in Esperanto after Safavi- outskirts of Gilan (Gilan province was divided into two parts Esperanto after Vbyh tu) in 975 AD Jamshid Khan, son of Sultan Mahmoud was given. Jamshid Khan in the year 989 AH murdered by his vizier. Two sons named Jamshid Khan Ibrahim Khan and Mohammad Amin Khan over the territory to contend with some parents. Ibrahim Khan Mohammad Amin Khan refuge shelter appreciable princes are princes Branch. Mohammad Amin Khan puts his base in Khoshkebijar .... According to E. Rabino in the provinces of Gilan Daralmrz Khoshkbijari about 100 years ago with 1600 houses, as well as a weekly market on Monday was the fifth Saturday

Weather
Khoshkebijar climate with humid and mild climate is particularly Gilan has a lot of 974/3 mm rainfall per year and an average humidity of 89% and average 6.16c°  thermal equilibrium. Absolute maximum temperature of 28.5 degrees and a minimum temperature of 7.5 absolute in different seasons of the year. 37/5 warmest months of July and August average 38 C° and the coldest months of the year the average Persian date 14 Bahman and March is 15 degrees. The months of February and March rain 274/5 221 mm and less rain in the months of April and December 50 by 46.5 mm and the number of rainy days in 136 days.

Influential people
 Very successful people from this region have become famous in Iran. The most famous of these people is Saeed Yaghoubzadeh Vishkaei, who was awarded the High Environmental Medal by the President in 2019 due to his many efforts to promote carp sport fishing in Iran'''.

Landmarks
bazaar hundred-year-old market in downtown on Monday & Thursday
Park City Khoshkebijar
Tuberculosis (Lagoon) Jaktaj a gathering place -Bgyr Everglade birds
Baths historic property dating back nearly a century
Beaches of recreational place Beautiful

References

Populated places in Rasht County

Cities in Gilan Province